Llandough Platform was a short-lived railway station which served the village of Llandough in the Vale of Glamorgan.

The station was at the head of the Llandough Sidings, which had a capacity of 978 wagons. The station closed in 1918, after a mere fourteen years.

No trace remains of the station today. The Llandough Sidings no longer exist, and the site was wasteground by the late 1980s, with the location of Llandough Platform marked by a signpost.

References

Disused railway stations in the Vale of Glamorgan
Railway stations in Great Britain opened in 1904
Railway stations in Great Britain closed in 1918
Former Taff Vale Railway stations